A perpetual stew, also known as forever soup, hunter's pot or hunter's stew, is a pot into which whatever foodstuffs one can find is placed and cooked. The pot is never or rarely emptied all the way, and ingredients and liquid are replenished as necessary. Such foods can continue cooking for decades or longer, if properly maintained. The concept is often a common element in descriptions of medieval inns. Foods prepared in a perpetual stew have been described as being flavorful due to the manner in which the ingredients blend together.

Examples
Perpetual stews are speculated to have been common in medieval cuisine, often as pottage or pot-au-feu:

Between August 2014 and April 2015, a New York restaurant served broth from the same perpetual stew (a master stock) for over eight months.

A batch of pot-au-feu was claimed by one writer to be maintained as a perpetual stew in Perpignan from the 15th century until World War II, when it ran out of ingredients to keep the stew going due to the German occupation.

The tradition of perpetual stew is also kept alive in some Southern and Eastern Asian countries:

Wattana Panich restaurant in Bangkok, Thailand, has continued to maintain the broth from the same perpetual stew for over  years.

The food industry in Japan still maintains perpetual stews in certain traditional dishes, for instance in ramen and oden:

Otafuku, one of the oldest oden restaurants in Japan, has been heating up the same batch of broth every day since 1945.

Ingredients
Various ingredients can be used in a perpetual stew, such as root vegetables and tubers (onion, carrot, garlic, parsnip, turnip, etc.) and various meats.

In popular culture
William Gibson references a perpetual stew served on the Bridge in his novel Idoru.

In A Song of Ice and Fire by George R. R. Martin, Arya eats from a perpetual stew, into which she contributes a pigeon, while in the slums of Kings Landing.

In  Kingdom Come: Deliverance  the perpetual stew is a free food source that the player can use. They can be found all over the gameworld.

See also

References

Medieval cuisine
Stews